The Panzerkorps Großdeutschland was a German panzer corps in the Wehrmacht which saw action on the Eastern Front in 1944/1945 during World War II.

Creation and service history
On September 28, 1944 the OKH ordered the creation of Panzer Corps Grossdeutschland. It was planned to contain enlarged corps troops and several panzer divisions; a unit that could be used as strong reserve for an army. To achieve this, parts of the Panzer-Grenadier-Division Großdeutschland were, while the division retained its status, used as base for the Generalkommando Panzerkorps Großdeutschland.
 
Units for the staff and the corps troops were:
Remnants of the (dissolved) 18th Artillery Division
Artillerie-Division-Stab 18 (Division Staff)
Divisions-Nachrichten-Abteilung 88 (Signals Battalion 88)
Div.Nachschubtruppen 88 (Division Supply Troops 88)
Remnants of the (dissolved) XIII Army Corps
Elements of the Panzer-Grenadier-Division Großdeutschland
III., Grenadier Regiment Großdeutschland
Elements of the Panzer-Grenadier-Division Brandenburg
III., Jäger(mot) Regiment 1 Brandenburg
Elements of the Wehrkreiskommando I (command personnel of military district, Wehrkreis I)
Feldpostamt z.b.V. 605 (Field Post Office z.b.V. [for special purpose] 605)

With the addition of the Panzer-Grenadier-Division Brandenburg the corps had its first structure with two active divisions. The first commander of the corps was General der Panzertruppe Dietrich von Saucken, the former commander of the XXXIX Panzer Corps.

Still in the forming phase during the looming of the  Soviet Vistula–Oder Offensive the staff and the Brandenburg Division were ordered to Poland, while the Division Großdeutschland was detached to Eastern Prussia. Ultimately the corps never fought as a unified body, and during the retreat towards the west its composition steadily changed. When von Saucken was promoted to command the 2nd Army in February he was succeeded by General der Panzertruppe Georg Jauer, who commanded the corps's 20. Panzer-Grenadier-Division. Never surrendering at-large the corps was dismissed on war's end on May 8, 1945.

Order of Battle – March 1, 1945

Staff Panzercorps Großdeutschland

Corps Troops
Heavy Panzer Battalion Großdeutschland 
Corps Fusilier Regiment Großdeutschland
I. Fusilier (Bicycle) Btln.
II. Fusilier (Bicycle) Btln.
Regimental Support Company (mot)
Panzer Field-Replacement Rgt. Großdeutschland
44th Panzer Signals Battalion
500th Artillery Brigade Staff
Observation Battery (mot)
500th Panzer Artillery Regiment (I. & II. Btln.)
500th Pioneer Regimental Staff (mot)
500th Panzer Pioneer Btln.
500th Reconnaissance Company (half-track)
500th Staff Escort Company
500th Sound Ranging Platoon (mot)
500th Mapping Detachment (mot)
500th Military Police Detachment
500th Supply Regiment (mot)

Division z.b.V. 615 / Divisions-Stab z.b.V. 615
Generalmajor Gerd-Paul von Below

Division Staff z.b.V. 615
687th Pioneer Brigade
3093rd Fortress Machine-Gun Btln.
3094th Fortress Machine-Gun Btln.
3095th Fortress Machine-Gun Btln.
1485th Fortress Infantry Btln.
Infantry Battalion z.b.V. 500

Fallschirm-Panzer Division 1 Hermann Göring
Generalmajor Max Lemke

Division Staff
Fallschirm-Panzergrenadier Regiment 1 Hermann Göring (I. & II. Btln.)
Fallschirm-Panzergrenadier Regiment 2 Hermann Göring (I. & II. Btln.)
Fallschirm-Panzer Regiment Hermann Göring (I., II. & III. Btln.)
Fallschirm-Panzer Artillery Regiment 1 Hermann Göring (I., II. & III. Btln.)
Fallschirm-Panzer Fusilier Btln. 1 Hermann Göring
Fallschirm-Panzer Reconnaissance Btln. 1 Hermann Göring
Fallschirm-Panzer Pioneer Btln. 1 Hermann Göring
Fallschirm-Panzer Signals Btln. 1 Hermann Göring
Fallschirm-Panzer Field-Replacement Btln. 1 Hermann Göring
Military Police Detachment
Field Post Office 1 Hermann Göring
Supply Detachment 1 Hermann Göring

Panzer-Grenadier-Division Brandenburg
Generalmajor Hermann Schulte-Heuthaus

Division Staff Brandenburg
Jäger(mot) Regiment 1 Brandenburg (I. & II. Btln.)
Jäger(mot) Regiment 2 Brandenburg (I. & II. Btln.)
Panzer Regiment Brandenburg
I. Panzer Btln. (detached)
II. Panzer Btln.
Tank Destroyer Btln. Brandenburg
Armoured Artillery Regiment Brandenburg (I., II. & III. Btln.)
Armoured Flak Artillery Btln. Brandenburg
Armoured Reconnaissance Btln. Brandenburg
Panzer Pioneer Btln. Brandenburg
Panzer Signals Btln. Brandenburg
Field-Replacement Btln. Brandenburg
Supply Regiment Brandenburg

20. Panzer-Grenadier-Division
Generalmajor Georg Scholze

Division Staff
76th Panzer-Grenadier Regiment (I., II. & III. Btln.)
90th Panzer-Grenadier Regiment (I., II. & III. Btln.)
8th Panzer Btln.
20th Artillery Regiment (I., II. & III. Btln.)
284th/285th Flak Artillery Btln.
120th Armoured Reconnaissance Btln.
20th Anti-Tank Btln.
20th Field-Replacement Btln.
20th Armoured Signals Btln.
20th Supply Regiment

Commanders
General Dietrich von Saucken (1944 – February 11, 1945)
General Georg Jauer (February 12, 1945 – May 8, 1945)

Notes

Footnotes

References
Books

 

Websites

 

Panzer corps of Germany in World War II
Military units and formations established in 1944
Military units and formations disestablished in 1945